Daboll is a surname. Notable people with the surname include:

Brian Daboll (born 1975), Canadian-born American football coach
Celadon Leeds Daboll (1818–1866), American merchant and inventor
Nathan Daboll (1750–1818), American educator
Nathan Daboll (politician) (1780–1863), American politician, judge, and author

See also
Daboll trumpet